Allerton may refer to:

Places

United Kingdom
Allerton, Liverpool
Allerton railway station
Allerton, West Yorkshire, a suburb of Bradford, England
Allerton Bywater, a village in West Yorkshire
Allerton Mauleverer, a parish between Harrogate and York in England
Allerton Castle
Chapel Allerton, part of the city of Leeds, England
Chapel Allerton, Somerset, a village in southwest England
Moor Allerton, an area of Leeds, England
Northallerton, a town in North Yorkshire, England, formerly Allerton
Allerton (wapentake), an ancient subdivision of the North Riding of Yorkshire

United States
 Allerton, Illinois, a village located in Champaign County
 Allerton, Iowa, a city located in Wayne County
 Allerton, a neighborhood in Hull, Massachusetts
 Allerton Garden in Hawaii, named after Robert and John Gregg Allerton
 Allerton, The Bronx, a neighborhood in New York City, New York

Other
Allerton Hotel, Chicago, Illinois
Allerton (surname)
 Baron Allerton, a title in the peerage of the United Kingdom